Ayanin is an O-methylated flavonol, a type of flavonoid. It is the 3,7,4'-tri-O-methylated derivative of quercetin.

It can be found in Croton schiedeanus. It can also be synthesized.

Biosynthesis 
The enzyme 3,7-dimethylquercetin 4'-O-methyltransferase uses S-adenosyl methionine and rhamnazin to produce S-adenosylhomocysteine and ayanin.

References 

O-methylated flavonols